Abbas Salim al-Halabi (born 1948) is a Lebanese politician currently serving as Minister of Education in the Third Cabinet of Najib Mikati.

References

Living people
1948 births
Education ministers of Lebanon
Lebanese Druze
Progressive Socialist Party politicians
Paris Nanterre University alumni
Saint Joseph University alumni
People from Baabda District
Date of birth missing (living people)